Paddy Gray may refer to:

 Paddy Gray (cricketer) (1892–1977), Australian cricketer
 Paddy Gray (footballer) (1872–?), Scottish footballer